Like all municipalities of Puerto Rico, Quebradillas is subdivided into administrative units called barrios, which are roughly comparable to minor civil divisions, (and means wards or boroughs or neighborhoods in English). The barrios and subbarrios, in turn, are further subdivided into smaller local populated place areas/units called sectores (sectors in English). The types of sectores may vary, from normally sector to urbanización to reparto to barriada to residencial, among others. Some sectors appear in two barrios.

List of sectors by barrio

Cacao

Calle Las Rosas
Carretera 113
Carretera 477
Carretera 480
Estancias del Pirata
Estancias San Javier
Parcelas Chivas
Reparto La Romana
Sector Cubujón
Sector Juan Morell
Sector La Romana
Sector Lasalle
Sector Las Chivas
Sector Quin Ávila
Sector Talas
Urbanización Haciendas de Guajataca
Urbanización Santa Marina

Charcas
Carretera 437
Sector El Llano
Sector Los Muñices

Cocos
Calle La Ceiba
Calle Lucía Rivera
Calle Socorro
Calle Vicentita Delís
Carretera 482
Carretera 483
Carretera 485
Carretera Ramal 484
Extensión Lamela
Parcelas Los Cocos
Reparto Amador
Reparto Bordel
Residencial Francisco Vigo Salas
Residencial Villa Julia
Sector Arturo Jiménez
Sector Cuatro Calles
Sector Dámaso Soto
Sector El Verde
Sector Felipe Cruz
Sector Hoyo Brujo (Fito Valle)
Sector Julián Hernández
Sector La Ceiba
Sector La Cuesta
Sector Lajas
Sector Las Piedras
Sector Los González
Sector Los Lugo
Sector Los Paganes
Sector Pallens
Urbanización Ávila
Urbanización El Retiro
Urbanización Hacienda Guadalupe
Urbanización Kennedy
Urbanización Las Ceibas (from km 99.1 of Carretera 2)
Urbanización Villa Norma

Guajataca
Carretera 119
Carretera 453
Sector Charcas
Sector Cico Hernández
Sector Julio Nieves
Sector Las Palmas
Sector Los Jaca
Sector Los Méndez
Sector Los Vargas
Sector Los Vélez
Sector Man Rodríguez
Sector Margarita
Sector Medina
Sector Potracio Nieves
Sector Pozada de Amor
Sector Riego
Sector Román

Quebradillas barrio-pueblo
Residencial Jardines del Carmen
Urbanización La Ceiba

San Antonio
Calle Guelo Sonera
Calle Pedro López
Carretera Nueva
Carretera 113
Carretera 478
Carretera 480
Carretera 482
Carretera 483
Parcelas San Antonio
Sector Arizona
Sector Barca de Oro (Negocio)
Sector Casa de Piedra
Sector El Fósforo
Sector Guzmán
Sector La Hacienda
Sector La Rabúa
Sector Los Romanes
Sector Montadero
Sector Palmarito
Sector Piquiñas

San José
Calle San Miguel
Camimo de Aniceto Román
Carretera 485
Condominio Paraíso del Atlántico
Residencial Parque del Retiro
Sector Jayuya
Sector Yeguada (Carretera 435)
Urbanización Brisa Tropical

Terranova
Calle Coliseo
Calle del Parque
Calle Las Flores
Camino Amador
Carretera 113
Carretera 477
Parcelas Terranova
Reparto Muñoz
Residencial Guarionex
Sector Estación
Sector Juan González
Sector Las Cuevitas
Sector Los Barros
Sector Los Prietos
Sector Quebrada Mala
Sector Rábano
Sector Villa Durán
Sector Villa Varguitas
Urbanización San Rafael

See also

 List of communities in Puerto Rico

References

Quebradillas
Quebradillas